Tusindårsskoven (meaning "The Thousand Year Forest") is a forest in southwestern Odense, Funen, Denmark. The open grass area features a hill and is surrounded by newer afforestation. The forest was established in 1988, in connection with Odense Municipality's celebration of the city's thousandth anniversary.

References

External links
 
 Tusindårsskoven at Danmarks Naturfredingsforening 

Forests of Denmark
Geography of Odense
1988 establishments in Denmark